Villaescusa is a municipality located in the autonomous community of Cantabria, Spain. It has a population of 3,802 inhabitants (2013).

Localities 

 La Concha (Caipital)
 Liaño
 Obregón
 Villanueva de Villaescusa

References

Municipalities in Cantabria